There have been made connections between mathematics and the existence of God, including their use as an argument for the existence of God and as an application of the decision theory to the belief in God.

Mathematics as an argument for the existence of God
In the 1070s, Anselm of Canterbury, an Italian medieval philosopher and theologian, created an ontological argument which sought to use logic to prove the existence of God. A more elaborate version was given by Gottfried Leibniz in the early eighteenth century. Kurt Gödel created a formalization of Leibniz' version, known as Gödel's ontological proof.

A more recent argument was made by Stephen D. Unwin in 2003, who suggested to use a formula for Bayesian probability to estimate the probability of God's existence.

Mathematics as a part of decision theory
A common application of the decision theory to the belief in God which applies mathematics is Pascal's Wager, published by Blaise Pascal in his 1669 work Pensées. The application was a defense of Christianity stating that "If God does not exist, the Atheist loses little by believing in him and gains little by not believing. If God does exist, the Atheist gains eternal life by believing and loses an infinite good by not believing".

See also

Existence of God

Further reading
 Cohen, Daniel J., Equations from God: Pure Mathematics and Victorian Faith, Johns Hopkins University Press, 2007 .
 Livio, Mario, Is God a Mathematician?, Simon & Schuster, 2011 .
 Ransford, H. Chris, God and the Mathematics of Infinity: What Irreducible Mathematics Says about Godhood, Columbia University Press, 2017 .

References

Mathematics
God
Arguments against the existence of God
Arguments for the existence of God